Pakistan Foreign Office Women's Association (PFOWA) is a non-political, non profit, charitable organization, dedicated to the welfare of the low paid employees of the Ministry of Foreign Affairs and their families. It aims to assist their children with education provide financial help to the widows of the Foreign Office staff and extends a helping hand, in cases requiring medical assistance. Spouses of all foreign office officials and lady officers of the Ministry are members of PFOWA.

The main source of fundraising for the welfare work performed has been the Charity Shows/ Bazaars that are held annually. Various Pakistan Missions Abroad, Foreign Minister's Office and Foreign Secretary's Office also give financial aid to the institution. The institution also accepts donations from other charitable individuals.

References
 PFOWA Official Website
 PFOWA Donates, Pakistan Observer, August 17, 2010
 PFOWA Charity Bazaar: Diplomatic community shows solidarity with Pakistanis, Daily Times, April 26, 2010
 PFOWA ANNUAL PRIZE DISTRIBUTION CEREMONY, Pakistan Ministry of Foreign Affairs
 PPFOWA holds charity bazaar 

Non-profit organisations based in Pakistan
Welfare in Pakistan
Women's organisations based in Pakistan
Organizations with year of establishment missing